Haapanen is a Finnish surname. Notable people with the surname include:

 Santeri Haapanen (1877–1957), Finnish schoolteacher, farmer and politician
 Jalmari Haapanen (1882–1961), Finnish farmer and politician
 Toivo Haapanen (1889–1950), Finnish conductor and music scholar
 Lauri Haapanen (1889–1947), Finnish wrestler
 Markus Haapanen (born 1996), Finnish ice hockey defenceman

Finnish-language surnames